La Moinerie is an impact crater in Quebec, Canada. It is 8 km in diameter and the age is estimated to be 400 ± 50 million years (Silurian or Devonian). The crater is exposed to the surface and filled with water, forming Lac La Moinerie.  Glaciers have eroded many of La Moinerie crater's original physical features, including much of the central uplift. It is located in Rivière-Koksoak, in the Kativik territory.

References

Further reading 
 Gold, D.P. Tanner, J.G. and Halliday, D.W. (1978) "The Lac La Moinerie crater: A probable impact site in New Quebec" (abstract). Geological Society of America, v. 10, p. 44.

External links 
 Aerial Exploration of the La Moinerie Structure

Impact craters of Quebec
Silurian impact craters
Devonian impact craters
Devonian Quebec
Silurian Quebec
.craters
.craters
Landforms of Nord-du-Québec